Nikolaos "Nikos" Zisis (alternate spelling: Zissis; ; born August 16, 1983) is a Greek basketball executive and former professional basketball player. During his pro club playing career, at a height of 1.97 m (6'5 ") tall, he played at both the point guard and shooting guard positions. He was inducted into the  Greek Basket League Hall of Fame in 2022. He is currently the general manager of the senior Greek men's national basketball team.

During his senior men's club playing career, Zisis won the 2008 EuroLeague championship, while he was a member of the Russian club CSKA Moscow. Zisis also won nine national league championships, in various European domestic leagues. He won a Greek League title, four Italian League titles, two Russian League titles, and two German League titles.

In addition to that, he also won nine European national domestic cup titles. He won two Greek Cups, four Italian Cups, one Russian Cup, and two German Cups. He also won five European national domestic super cup titles. As he won four Italian Supercups and one German Supercup. Two of his club teams, HAN Thessaloniki and Brose Bamberg, retired his team jerseys.

As a member of the senior Greek national basketball team, Zisis won the gold medal at the 2005 EuroBasket, the silver medal at the 2006 FIBA World Cup, and the bronze medal at the 2009 EuroBasket.

Early years
Zisis started his basketball playing career in 1996, playing with the junior teams of HAN Thessaloniki (English: YMCA Thessaloniki). He was with the club until 2000. The club would later go on to retire his jersey, in 2021.

Professional career

AEK Athens
At the age of 17, Zisis moved to Athens, and to the Greek League team AEK, where he began his professional basketball career. With AEK, he won the Greek Cup in 2001, and also the Greek League championship, in 2002. He also won the Greek League Best Young Player award in 2002.

Benetton Treviso
After playing with the Greek club AEK Athens, Zisis moved to Treviso, Italy, and played on the Italian League team Benetton Treviso. With Treviso, he won the Italian Super Cup and the Italian League championship in the year 2006, and also the Italian Cup in the year 2007. He then left Italy, and moved to Moscow, Russia.

CSKA Moscow
On June 13, 2007, Zisis signed a 3-year contract worth €5 million euros net income with the Russian team CSKA Moscow. With CSKA, Zisis won the EuroLeague championship at the 2008 EuroLeague Final Four. He also played in the 2009 EuroLeague Final with CSKA. While he was a member of CSKA, he also won two Russian League championships (2008, 2009).

Montepaschi Siena
In 2009, Zisis left CSKA Moscow, and signed a 2-year contract worth €1.6 million euros net income with the Italian League club Montepaschi Siena. In 2010, he signed a 2-year extension with Montepaschi. With Siena, he won three Italian League championships (2010, 2011, 2012), three Italian Cups winner (2010, 2011, 2012), and three Italian Cup Supercups (2010, 2011, 2012).

Bilbao Basket
In 2012, Zisis signed a 2-year contract, with the second year being an optional year, with the Spanish League club Bilbao.

UNICS Kazan
After spending a season with the Spanish club Bilbao Basket, Zisis moved to the Russian VTB United League club UNICS Kazan, in July 2013. With UNICS, he played in the 2014 Eurocup Finals. With UNICS, he also won the 2014 edition of the Russian Cup.

Fenerbahçe
On December 29, 2014, the Turkish Super League club Fenerbahçe Ülker acquired Zisis. With Zisis playing an average of 23.5 minutes per game with Fenerbahçe in the 2014–15 EuroLeague season, the team advanced to the 2015 EuroLeague Final Four. It was the first time in the team's history that they made it to the EuroLeague Final Four. However, on May 15, 2015, they lost in the EuroLeague semifinals to the Spanish club Real Madrid, by a score of 96–87.

Brose Bamberg
On July 16, 2015, Zisis signed a two-year contract with the German Basketball Bundesliga (BBL) club Brose Bamberg. In 2017, he extended his contract with Brose, through the year 2019. With Bamberg, he won two German BBL League championships (2016, 2017), two German Cups (2017, 2019), and the German Supercup (2015). In the 2019 German Cup Final, Zisis hit the game-winner, with 2.4 seconds left in the game, to give Bamberg an 83–82 win over Alba Berlin. On September 7, 2019, Bamberg retired Zisis' number 6 jersey.

Joventut Badalona
On July 15, 2019, Zisis signed a two-year deal with the Spanish Liga ACB club Joventut Badalona.

Return to AEK Athens
In January 2020, Zisis left the Spanish club Joventut Badalona, and signed with his former club AEK Athens, of the FIBA Champions League. With AEK, Zisis won the 2020 edition of the Greek Cup, in which he was also named the Greek Cup MVP. Zisis announced his retirement from playing professional club basketball in June 2021.

National team career

Greek junior national team
With Greece's under-16 junior national team, Zisis won the silver medal at the 1999 FIBA Under-16 European Championship, and he also led the tournament in scoring. Zisis also won the silver medal with Greece's under-18 junior national team, at the 2000 Albert Schweitzer Under-18 World Tournament. He also won the bronze medal at the 2000 FIBA Under-18 European Championship. In addition, Zisis won the gold medal with the Greek under-20 junior national team at the 2002 FIBA Under-20 European Championship, where he was also named the tournament's MVP.

Greece national team
Zisis played with Greece's men's under-26 national selection at the 2001 Tunis Mediterranean Games. At the Mediterranean Games, he helped Greece win the silver medal at the tournament. As a member of the  Greek men's national basketball team, Zisis won the gold medal at the 2005 EuroBasket, which was held in Serbia and Montenegro. He was Greece's leading scorer during the tournament, averaging 10.6 points per game. At the end of the semifinal game against the French national basketball team, Zisis drove the length of the court, drove into the middle of the floor, drew a double team, and then dished the ball out to Dimitris Diamantidis, who hit a game-winning 3 pointer. After his great performance at the EuroBasket in 2005, Zisis was named the FIBA Europe Young Player of the Year.

The next year, at the 2006 FIBA World Championship, which was held in Japan, Zisis hit a game winning 3-point shot at the end of the game against the Australian national basketball team, to give Greece a 72–69 victory. However, in the next game in the tournament, he was hit on the cheekbone and eye socket bone by the elbow of the Brazilian national basketball team's Anderson Varejão. Zisis suffered a severe facial injury that forced him to sit out for the remaining entirety of the 2006 World Championship, as the injury required surgery. Even though Greece lost Zisis, who was their leading scorer the year before at the 2005 EuroBasket, they were still able to win the silver medal (including an improbable upset victory over Team USA in the semifinals) during the World Championship tournament.

At the 2007 EuroBasket, Zisis was one of the two key Greek players, along with Theo Papaloukas, that led Greece's national team to the biggest comeback in the history of the EuroBasket, against the Slovenian national basketball team. The comeback was called "the miracle". Greece finished the tournament in 4th place.

Zisis also competed with Greece at the 2004 Summer Olympics, where Greece finished in 5th place in the world, and at the 2008 Summer Olympics, where Greece also finished in 5th place in the world. He also played at the following tournaments: the 2009 EuroBasket, where he won a bronze medal, the 2010 FIBA World Championship, the 2011 EuroBasket, the 2012 FIBA World Olympic Qualifying Tournament, the 2013 EuroBasket, the 2014 FIBA World Cup, and the 2015 EuroBasket.

After the conclusion of the 2015 EuroBasket tournament, Zisis retired from the senior Greek national team. Zisis finished his national team career with Greece, having won a total of ten medals at all levels, eight of which came in FIBA competitions. In 2019, the Hellenic Basketball Federation honored Zisis, in recognition of his contributions to the senior Greece men's national basketball team, with which he had 189 caps (games played).

Executive career
In October 2021, Zisis began a career working as a basketball executive, when he became the general manager of the senior Greek men's national basketball team.

Player profile
At 1.97 m (6 ft 5  in) tall, Zisis played mainly at the point guard and shooting guard positions, while also playing sometimes at the small forward position. Over his playing career, his primary position with his pro club teams was point guard, while his primary position with the senior Greek men's national basketball team was shooting guard. During his playing career, Zisis was known as "The Lord of the Rings", because he is the Greek player with the most combined medals won at the cadet, junior, young men's, and senior men's European and world FIBA tournaments.

Personal life
Zisis is very close friends with fellow former Greek men's national basketball team players Vassilis Spanoulis, Ioannis Bourousis, and Panos Vasilopoulos. He is also friends with former Italian national basketball team player Andrea Bargnani. He married Fani Skoufi in 2010, with Vassilis Spanoulis being his best man. His nickname is "The Lord of the Rings."

Career statistics

EuroLeague

|-
| style="text-align:left;"| 2000–01
| style="text-align:left;" rowspan=5| AEK
| 2 || 2 || 17.0 || .400 || .000 || .000 || 1.5 || .0 || .0 || .0 || 2.0 || -2.5
|-
| style="text-align:left;"| 2001–02
| 19 || 2 || 14.2 || .528 || .450 || .588 || .9 || 1.1 || .4 || .0 || 4.5 || 2.7
|-
| style="text-align:left;"| 2002–03
| 14 || 9 || 23.2 || .378 || .143 || .577 || 3.0 || 1.1 || .7 || .0 || 5.7 || 3.6
|-
| style="text-align:left;"| 2003–04
| 14 || 13 || 26.3 || .455 || .318 || .633 || 2.6 || 2.1 || .8 || .0 || 8.6 || 6.9
|-
| style="text-align:left;"| 2004–05
| 20 || 20 || 30.5 || .558 || .317 || .780 || 3.1 || 4.4 || .8 || .0 || 11.6 || 13.7
|-
| style="text-align:left;"| 2005–06
| style="text-align:left;" rowspan=2| Benneton
| 7 || 7 || 33.5 || .448 || .263 || .800 || 2.7 || 4.9 || 1.0 || .0 || 8.1 || 10.0
|-
| style="text-align:left;"| 2006–07
| 20 || 20 || 33.1 || .470 || .345 || .828 || 2.5 || 4.3 || 1.2 || .1 || 11.0 || 12.3
|-
| style="text-align:left;background:#AFE6BA;"| 2007–08†
| style="text-align:left;" rowspan=2| CSKA Moscow
| 25 || 2 || 15.4 || .544 || .167 || .833 || 1.8 || 1.4 || .4 || .0 || 4.3 || 4.1
|-
| style="text-align:left;"| 2008–09
| 21 || 2 || 16.2 || .571 || .350 || .900 || 1.3 || 1.7 || .2 || .0 || 5.3 || 5.6
|-
| style="text-align:left;"| 2009–10
| style="text-align:left;" rowspan=3| Siena
| 16 || 1 || 16.0 || .481 || .167 || .806 || 1.3 || 1.7 || .5 || .0 || 5.4 || 4.6
|-
| style="text-align:left;"| 2010–11
| 22 || 10 || 21.5 || .388 || .257 || .848 || 1.9 || 2.6 || .9 || .0 || 6.0 || 6.8
|-
| style="text-align:left;"| 2011–12
| 20 || 4 || 19.5 || .414 || .259 || .800 || 1.7 || 2.6 || .3 || .0 || 4.5 || 5.4
|-
| style="text-align:left;"| 2014–15
| style="text-align:left;"| UNICS
| 10 || 7 || 19.5 || .405 || .421 || .889 || 2.8 || 3.6 || .3 || .0 || 7.0 || 8,6
|-
| style="text-align:left;"| 2014–15
| style="text-align:left;"| Fenerbahçe
| 19 || 13 || 19.5 || .450 || .333 || .600 || 2.0 || 3.6 || .4 || .1 || 5.4 || 5,2
|-
| style="text-align:left;"| 2015–16
| style="text-align:left;" rowspan=3| Brose Bamberg
| 24 || 20 || 26.0 || .500 || .388 || .800 || 2.7 || 3.6 || .4 || .0 || 10.1 || 11.8
|-
| style="text-align:left;"| 2016–17
| 30 || 24 || 24.0 || .436 || .288 || .913 || 2.0 || 4.5 || .5 || .0 || 7.7 || 9.8
|-
| style="text-align:left;"| 2017–18
| 27 || 20 || 22.3 || .444 || .410 || .818 || 2.1 || 2.8 || .5 || .0 || 6.3 || 6.9
|- class="sortbottom"
| align="center" colspan="2"| Career
| 310 || 176 || 22.1 || .418 || .312 || .790 || 2.1 || 2.9 || .6 || .0 || 6.9 || 7.4

Awards and accomplishments

Club titles and national team medals won
AEK Athens
Greek Cup (2): 2000–01, 2019–20
Greek Basket League: 2001–02
Treviso
Italian A League: 2005–06
Italian Cup: 2007
Italian Super Cup: 2006
Montepaschi Siena
Italian A League (3): 2009–10, 2010–11, 2011–12
Italian Cup (3): (2010, 2011, 2012)
Italian Cup Supercup (3): (2010, 2011, 2012)
CSKA Moscow
EuroLeague champion: 2007–08
Russian Professional Championship: (2) 2007–08, 2008–09
VTB United League: 2008–09
UNICS Kazan
Russian Cup: 2013–14
Brose Bamberg
German BBL champion (2): 2015–16, 2016–17
German Cup (2): 2017, 2018–19
German Super Cup: 2015

Greek junior national team
1999 FIBA Under-16 European Championship: 
2000 Albert Schweitzer Under-18 World Tournament: 
2000 FIBA Under-18 European Championship: 
2002 FIBA Under-20 European Championship:

Greek senior national team
2001 Mediterranean Games: 
8× Acropolis Tournament Champion: (2004, 2005, 2006, 2007, 2008, 2009, 2010, 2013)
2005 EuroBasket: 
2006 FIBA Stanković World Cup: 
2006 FIBA World Cup: 
2008 FIBA World OQT: 
2009 EuroBasket:

Individual awards
FIBA Under-16 European Championship Top Scorer: 1999
Greek League Best Young Player: 2001–02
FIBA Under-20 European Championship MVP: 2002
2× Greek League All-Star: 2004, 2005
FIBA Europe Young Player of the Year: 2005
Acropolis Tournament MVP: (2013)
German Cup Final MVP: 2019
Number 6 jersey retired by Brose Bamberg: 2019
Greek Cup MVP: 2020
Jersey retired by HAN Thessaloniki: 2021
Greek Basket League Hall of Fame: 2022

References

External links

 Nikos Zisis at acb.com 
 Nikos Zisis at basket.gr 
 Nikos Zisis at draftexpress.com
 Nikos Zisis at easycredit-bbl.de
 Nikos Zisis at eurobasket.com
 Nikos Zisis at euroleague.net
 Nikos Zisis at fiba.com (archive)
 Nikos Zisis at fibaeurope.com
 Nikos Zisis at legabasket.it 
 Nikos Zisis at tblstat.net
 Nikos Zisis at esake.gr  
 

1983 births
Living people
2006 FIBA World Championship players
2010 FIBA World Championship players
2014 FIBA Basketball World Cup players
AEK B.C. players
Basketball players at the 2004 Summer Olympics
Basketball players at the 2008 Summer Olympics
Basketball players from Thessaloniki
BC UNICS players
Bilbao Basket players
Brose Bamberg players
Competitors at the 2001 Mediterranean Games
Fenerbahçe men's basketball players
FIBA EuroBasket-winning players
Greek basketball executives and administrators
Greek Basket League players
Greek expatriate basketball people in Germany
Greek expatriate basketball people in Spain
Greek Macedonians
Greek men's basketball players
HANTH B.C. players
Joventut Badalona players
Liga ACB players
Mediterranean Games medalists in basketball
Mediterranean Games silver medalists for Greece
Mens Sana Basket players
Olympic basketball players of Greece
Pallacanestro Treviso players
PBC CSKA Moscow players
Point guards
Shooting guards